Lakeview High School is a secondary education institution located within the Lakeview School District in Battle Creek, Michigan The name Lakeview reportedly comes from a teacher that was looking out a window of the first Lakeview school and decided that there was a "Lake view".

Academics
Lakview High School offers many options of education for students. In the 2020–2021 school year students have the option to attend in-person two days per week or the Lakeview Virtual Academy. Students can take select classes at the Calhoun Area Career Center, Michigan Virtual High School, and Math and Science courses at the Battle Creek Area Mathematics and Science Center. Lakeview High School also offers 21 Advanced Placement courses. Students are also allowed to take college courses, most commonly with Kellogg Community College, through dual enrollment.

Athletics
Lakeview offers 15 sports during the fall, winter, and spring.

Baseball (Men)
Basketball
Bowling
Boys Lacrosse (Men) Club sport 
Competitive Cheer (Women)
Cross Country
Football (Men)
Golf
Soccer
Softball (Women)
Swim
Tennis
Track and Field
Volleyball (Women)
Wrestling (Men)

Awards

2018-2019 Model 21st Century School Library
Karl Shafer - Honor Credit Union Annual Teacher Awards 
College Success Award 2018, 2019, and 2020
Dr. Margaret "Gigi" Lincoln of the 2008 I Love My Librarian Award
Dr. Margaret "Gigi" Lincoln of the 2012 Making it Happen Award
2013 Citation of Excellence

References

External links

Education in Calhoun County, Michigan
High schools in Michigan
Battle Creek, Michigan
Secondary education in the United States
Calhoun County, Michigan